Mamadou Konate (born 10 March 1985) is an Ivorian footballer who currently plays for Ekenäs IF in the Finnish second tier Ykkönen. He has previously played for Tricase in the Italian Serie C and for AC Oulu in the Finnish top division Veikkausliiga.

References 

1985 births
Living people
Footballers from Abidjan
Ivorian footballers
Ivorian expatriate footballers
Expatriate footballers in Finland
Veikkausliiga players
AC Oulu players
FC Jazz players
Ekenäs IF players
Oulun Luistinseura players

Association football forwards